Vítkov is a town in Opava District in the Moravian-Silesian Region of the Czech Republic. It has about 5,600 inhabitants.

Administrative parts
Villages of Jelenice, Klokočov, Nové Těchanovice, Podhradí, Prostřední Dvůr, Lhotka and Zálužné are administrative parts of Vítkov. Jelenice forms an exclave of the municipal territory.

Geography
It is located in the Nízký Jeseník mountain range. The Moravice River forms the northern municipal border.

History
The first written mention of Vítkov is from 1301. The town and the Vikštejn Castle were founded by Vítek of Kravaře in the second half of the 13th century. In the following centuries, the town often changed owners, who were among the lower nobles. In 1713–1714, the then owner of the Vítkov estate, Wipplar of Ulschitz had built a Baroque mansion. The Vikštejn Castle (today outside of municipal territory of Vítkov) was abandoned in 1776 and became a ruin.

The inhabitants subsisted mainly on cloth and linen crafts and agriculture. During the industrialisation in the second half of the 19th century, several textile factories were established. Gloves, ribbons and silk products were made here.

According to the Austrian census of 1910 the town had 3,570 inhabitants, almost all of them were German-speaking. Most populous religious group were Roman Catholics with 3,513 (98.4%).

In 1938, Vítkov was annexed by Nazi Germany and administered as a part of Reichsgau Sudetenland. After the World War II, the German population was expelled and the town was resettled by Czechs.

On 19 April 2009, an arson attack with three molotov cocktails thrown on house inhabited by a Roma family happened here.

Demographics

Sights

The landmark of the town is the parish Church of the Assumption of the Virgin Mary. It was built in the neo-Gothic style in 1914–1918.

Notable people
Ferdinand Hanusch (1866–1923), Austrian politician
Franz W. Seidler (born 1933), German historian
Helmut Kohlenberger (born 1942), German philosopher
Jan Zajíc (1950–1969), student who committed suicide by self-immolation as a political protest
Martin Čížek (born 1974), footballer
Lukáš Milo (born 1983), athlete
Radek Faksa (born 1994), ice hockey player

Twin towns – sister cities

Vítkov is twinned with:
 Kalety, Poland
 Vrbové, Slovakia

References

External links

 

Cities and towns in the Czech Republic
Populated places in Opava District